Vincenzo Roviglioni (died 14 September 1669) was a Roman Catholic prelate who served as Bishop of Bovino (1658–1669).

Biography
On 3 June 1658, Vincenzo Roviglioni was appointed during the papacy of Pope Alexander VII as Bishop of Bovino. He served as Bishop of Bovino until his death on 14 September 1669.

References 

17th-century Italian Roman Catholic bishops
Bishops appointed by Pope Alexander VII
1669 deaths